In manufacturing, changeover is the process of converting a line or machine from running one product to another. Changeover times can last from a few minutes to as much as several weeks in the case of automobile manufacturers retooling for new models. Reducing changeover times became a popular way to reduce waste in Lean manufacturing after Taiichi Ohno and Shingo Shigeo popularized the SMED (Single Minute Die Exchange) method in the, now famous, Toyota Production System (TPS). The terms set-up and changeover are sometimes used interchangeably however this usage is incorrect. Set-up is only one component of changeover. Example: A soft drink bottler may run 16oz glass bottles one day, perform a changeover on the line and then run 20oz plastic bottles the next day.

The 3 Ups 
Changeover can be divided into the 3 Ups:

Clean-up
Clean-up product, materials and components from the line. It may range from minor, if only the label of a package is being changed (for example from an English to a Spanish label) to major, requiring complete disassembly of the equipment, cleaning and sterilizing of the line components in the case of an injectable pharmaceutical product.

Set-upSet-up is the process of actually converting the equipment. This may be achieved by adjusting the equipment to correspond to the next product or by changing non-adjustable "change parts" to accommodate the product. Typically it will be a combination of both.

Start-upStart-up'' is the time spent fine tuning the equipment after it has been restarted. It is characterized by frequent stoppages, jams, quality rejects and other problems. It is generally caused by variability in the clean-up and set-up or by variability in the product or its components.

See also
 Retrofitting
 Sequence-dependent setup
 Single-Minute Exchange of Die

Industrial processes